Ein 'Arik is a Palestinian town in the Ramallah and al-Bireh Governorate, located 7 kilometers west of Ramallah in the northern West Bank. According to the Palestinian Central Bureau of Statistics (PCBS), the town had a population of 1,567 inhabitants consisting of Muslims (65%) and Christians (35%) in 2007.

Location
It is bordered by  Ein Qiniya to the east, Beituniya  to the east and south, and Deir Ibzi to the west and north.

History
Some assume, that it is the place of the Archites, mentioned in the Bible as being located between Bethel and Bethoron.

Southwest of Ein 'Arik is Khirbet al-Hafi, where Byzantine pottery has been found, together with glass fragments and ancient agricultural terraces. 

In the Crusader era  Ein 'Arik was known as Bayt Arif, and already by the mid-eleventh century the  village, together with another just north of Jerusalem, belonged to the  Jacobite Church. By 1099 the estate was deserted, and was  hence annexed by a Crusader, Geoffry of the Tower of David. In 1106, he was imprisoned in Egypt, and his nephew took over the estates. However, the Jacobite Church appealed to Queen Melisende to get their property back. This was finally granted in 1138.
Potsherds from the  Crusader/Abbasid and early Ottoman period have also been found.

According to Conder and Kitchener, Ein 'Arik was mentioned in Marino Sanuto's Map of the Holy Land as Arecha.

Ottoman era
Ein Arik, like the rest of Palestine, was incorporated into the Ottoman Empire in 1517, and in 1596   'Ain 'Arik  appeared in the  tax registers as being in the Nahiya of Quds of the Liwa of Quds.  It had a total population of 24 households, 14 Muslim and 10 Christian. The villagers paid  taxes on wheat, barley, olive trees, vineyards and fruit trees,  goats and beehives; a total of 4,300 akçe.

In 1838, Edward Robinson noted it as a partly Christian village, with 25 Christian men, and the rest Muslims. It was  located in the Beni Harith district, north of Jerusalem.

In 1870 the French explorer Victor Guérin found  Ein 'Arik to have "forty small houses, inhabited by half Muslim, half  Greek schismatics, who have a church."  An Ottoman village list of about the same year, 1870, showed that  Ein 'Arik had 41 houses with 179 Muslim men, and 24 houses with 80 Greek Christian men; a total of 65 houses with 259 men. The population count included men, only.

In 1883, the PEF's Survey of Western Palestine described Ain' Arik as "A small stone hamlet in a deep valley with a Greek church, the inhabitants being Greek Christians. There is a good spring to the west with a small stream. The place is surrounded with olives, and there are lemons and other trees round the water in a thick
grove."

In 1896 the population of  Ain arik  was estimated to be about 471 persons; half Christian and half Muslim.

British Mandate era
In the 1922 census of Palestine conducted by the British Mandate authorities, 'Ain 'Arik had a population of  365; 165 Muslims and 200  Christians; 144 Orthodox, 56 Roman Catholics, increasing in  the 1931 census, to 494; 220 Christians and 274 Muslims, living in a total of 117 houses.

In the 1945 statistics,  the population of 'Ein 'Arik was 610;  360 Muslims and 250 Christians,  while the total land area was 5,934 dunams, according to an official land and population survey. Of  this,  2,203  were allocated  for plantations and irrigable land, 1,168 for cereals, while 32 dunams were classified as built-up areas.

Jordanian era
In the wake of the 1948 Arab–Israeli War, and after the 1949 Armistice Agreements, Ein 'Arik came under Jordanian rule.

In 1961, the population of  '''Ain Arik was  1,385, of whom 260 were Christian.

1967 and aftermath
Since the Six-Day War in 1967,  Ein 'Arik has been under Israeli occupation,  and according to the Israeli census of that year, the population of Ain 'Arik'' stood at 642, of whom 215 were registered as having come  from Israel. 

After  the 1995 accords, 7.3% of village land has been defined as Area B land, while the remaining 92.7% is Area C. 

There are two churches located in the village, one Orthodox Christian and the other one is Roman Catholic Couvent Saint-Etienn. One mosque is located in the center of the village and has the tallest minaret in all of Palestine. Two-thirds of its inhabitants are Palestinian Muslims, and the remaining one-third are Palestinian Christians. The village council which consists of mostly Muslims is chaired by a Christian. Both Christians and Muslims have been living together since early on harmoniously by respecting each other's religion.

Ein 'Arik is known for the natural springs that run through the village and pour into the valley. Both springs, up until the year 2000, were used for drinking and cooking. The village has a large lush valley filled with fruit trees. In 1948 when Palestinians were exiled from their villages some refugees from different villages settled in Ein 'Arik due to the accessibility of clean water.

Ein 'Arik has a public swimming pool, which is open from May to September.  There are several restaurants in Ein 'Arik that serve traditional Arabic cuisine, but the most popular of the restaurants is the Falaha, which is very well known throughout the West-Bank area.

See also 
Palestinian Christians
Latin Patriarchate School of 'Ain 'Arik
2007 PCBS Census

References

Bibliography

External links
Welcome To 'Ayn 'Arik
Ein ‘Arik, Welcome to Palestine
Survey of Western Palestine, Map 17:    IAA, Wikimedia commons
Ain Arik Parish, Latin Patriarchate
'Ein 'Arik Village (Fact Sheet),  Applied Research Institute–Jerusalem (ARIJ)
 ‘Ein ‘Arik Village Profile, ARIJ
 'Ein 'Arik, aerial photo, ARIJ
Locality Development Priorities and Needs in ‘Ein ‘Arik Village, ARIJ
 Ein Arik, Unispal
Civil Administration nixes order to take land for settlement road,  June 14, 2012, The Times of Israel

Villages in the West Bank
Palestinian Christian communities
Municipalities of the State of Palestine